Leader's Gardens is a public urban park on the banks of the River Thames in the London Borough of Wandsworth, between Putney and Barnes town centres.

Geography 
The park has an area of 1.267 hectares, there are entrances from Putney Embankment on the north west, Ashlone Road to the south and Festing Road to the east. The small river Beverley Brook runs along the west side of the park and into the Thames.

At the north-west corner there is an old council building, now occupied by the Wandsworth, Chelsea and Fulham Sea Cadets and other youth groups. The park is part of Putney Embankment Conservation Area, which includes some of the oldest buildings in Putney.

History 
The area was laid out in 1890 on land from the estate of English politician John Temple Leader by Putney Parish and Leader Estate surveyor J C Radford, it was opened in 1903.

Features 

The gate at the Putney Embankment entrance is the original from 1903 and is made of cast iron, as are the railings surrounding the park, which have ornamental ball finials topped with tall spikes.

The Putney Sculpture Trail by sculpturer Alan Thornhill begins in the park, Exodus is in the centre of the park and was installed in 2008.

Wildlife 
The park has mature horse chestnut trees and a bug hotel was added in 2017

Amenities 
LooLoo's cafe is in the park and has public toilets

The children's playground is for under 7 year olds, new equipment was installed in 2012 with a rubber surface, and there is also skateboard area.

In 2017 a new play garden was laid out with logs and stepping stones.

Sports grounds 
There are three all weather tennis courts on the south side of the park which can be booked via All Star Tennis.

Transport 
The park is served by Transport for London buses 22 and 265 which stop on the Lower Richmond road, Putney Bridge tube station (District line) and Putney railway station (Southwestern Railway) are both a 15 minute walk from the park.  The Santander Cycles Putney Pier docking station is an 8 minute walk from the park.

References

External links 
 Wandsworth Borough Council page on Leader's Gardens

Urban public parks in the United Kingdom
Parks and open spaces in the London Borough of Wandsworth
1903 establishments in England
Putney